Nader Al-Tarhouni (born 24 October 1979 in Tripoli) is a Libyan football midfielder. He was a member of the Libya national football team.

Al-Tarhouni featured for Libya at the 2009 African Championship of Nations.

References

External links 

Player profile - MTN Africa Cup of Nations 2006
Player profile with Large Photo - sporting-heroes.net

1979 births
Living people
Libyan footballers
Libya international footballers
2006 Africa Cup of Nations players
Association football midfielders
Libyan expatriate footballers
Kazma SC players
Expatriate footballers in Kuwait
Expatriate footballers in Qatar
Expatriate footballers in the United Arab Emirates
Expatriate footballers in Egypt
Libyan expatriate sportspeople in Kuwait
Libyan expatriate sportspeople in Qatar
Libyan expatriate sportspeople in the United Arab Emirates
Libyan expatriate sportspeople in Egypt
Al-Sailiya SC players
Al-Wakrah SC players
Al-Ittihad Club (Tripoli) players
People from Tripoli, Libya
Al-Shaab CSC players
UAE First Division League players
UAE Pro League players
Qatar Stars League players
Kuwait Premier League players
Libyan Premier League players